M4 flame fuel thickening compound is a nonhygroscopic thickener, adi-acid aluminum soap of isooctanoic acids derived from isooctyl alcohol or isooctyl aldehyde, which are obtained from the oxidization of petroleum.  M4 is used in fire bombs and incendiary weapons.

References

See also
 Napalm
 MK-77

Incendiary weapons